John Olson may refer to:

John Olson (Minnesota politician) (1906–1981), member of the Minnesota Senate
John Olson (photographer), American photographer
John Olson (writer) (born 1947), American poet and novelist
John Olson (artist), a member of noise rock band Wolf Eyes
John E. Olson (1917–2012), retired U.S. Army colonel
John M. Olson (biophysicist) (1929–2017), American biochemist, pioneering researcher in photosynthesis
John M. Olson (general), United States Air Force general
John T. Olson (1929–2011), United States Air Force general
Johnny Olson (1910–1985), American radio and television announcer
Jack B. Olson (1920–2003), American businessman and politician
Jack Olson (Australian politician) (1916–2008), Australian politician
John Olson (forger), American who pled guilty to forging thousands of Muhammad Ali and other autographs

See also
Jon Olsson (born 1982), skier
John Olsen (disambiguation)